Mark Christopher Randall (born September 30, 1967) is an American former professional basketball player who played in four National Basketball Association (NBA) seasons for the Chicago Bulls, Minnesota Timberwolves, Detroit Pistons, and Denver Nuggets. Randall was selected by the Bulls in the first round (26th pick overall) of the 1991 NBA Draft and averaged 2.6 points per game for his career.

Randall attended Cherry Creek High School in Englewood, Colorado where he led the Bruins to the 1986 state title game.

He played collegiately for the University of Kansas. He was a sophomore when the Jayhawks won the 1988 National Championship, but he did not play for the team as a redshirt. He was a senior when the Jayhawks played for the 1991 National Championship where they lost to Duke 72–65. While at Kansas, Randall was an All-American, All-Big Eight pick and a conference All-Academic player. Randall also is the Big Eight all-time leader in field goal percentage, with a .620% career average.

He played for the US national team in the 1990 FIBA World Championship, winning the bronze medal.

Retirement
Following his NBA career, Randall was a college scout for the Denver Nuggets for 3 seasons and also became an Assistant Coach for 1 season. In 2004 he assumed the role as Community Ambassador for the Denver Nuggets. Currently he is a District Athletic Director for Denver Public Schools.

Career statistics

NBA

Source

Regular season

|-
| style="text-align:left;"| 
| style="text-align:left;"| Chicago
| 15 || 0 || 4.5 || .455 || .000 || .750 || .6 || .5 || .0 || .0 || 1.7
|-
| style="text-align:left;"| 
| style="text-align:left;"| Minnesota
| 39 || 0 || 9.6 || .457 || .214 || .743 || 1.6 || .7 || .3 || .1 || 3.7
|-
| style="text-align:left;"| 
| style="text-align:left;"| Minnesota
| 2 || 0 || 4.0 || .000 || .000 || – || .0 || .5 || .0 || .0 || .0
|-
| style="text-align:left;"| 
| style="text-align:left;"| Detroit
| 35 || 0 || 6.9 || .506 || .143 || .615 || 1.6 || .3 || .1 || .1 || 2.8
|-
| style="text-align:left;"| 
| style="text-align:left;"| Denver
| 28 || 0 || 5.5 || .340 || .143 || .786 || .8 || .4 || .3 || .1 || 2.1
|-
| style="text-align:left;"| 
| style="text-align:left;"| Denver
| 8 || 0 || 4.9 || .300 || .000 || – || 1.5 || .1 || .0 || .0 || .8
|-
| style="text-align:center;" colspan="2"| Career
| 127 || 0 || 7.0 || .443 || .154 || .722 || 1.3 || .4 || .2 || .1 || 2.6

Playoffs

|-
| style="text-align:left;"| 1994
| style="text-align:left;"| Denver
| 2 || 0 || 3.0 || .000 || – || – || 2.5 || .0 || .0 || .5 || .0

References

External links
 
 

1967 births
Living people
1990 FIBA World Championship players
All-American college men's basketball players
American men's basketball players
Basketball players from Minnesota
Chicago Bulls draft picks
Chicago Bulls players
Competitors at the 1990 Goodwill Games
Detroit Pistons players
Denver Nuggets players
Fort Wayne Fury players
Goodwill Games medalists in basketball
Kansas Jayhawks men's basketball players
La Crosse Bobcats players
McDonald's High School All-Americans
Minnesota Timberwolves players
Parade High School All-Americans (boys' basketball)
People from Edina, Minnesota
Power forwards (basketball)
Rapid City Thrillers players
United States men's national basketball team players
Universiade gold medalists for the United States
Universiade medalists in basketball